Zoran Đorđić (born 15 October 1966) is a Serbian former handball player. He is the father of fellow handball player Petar Đorđić.

Club career
In his home country, Đorđić played for Metaloplastika and Partizan (1992–1993), before going abroad. He would spend four seasons in France with OM Vitrolles (1993–1995) and Chambéry (1995–1997). In 1997, Đorđić moved to Germany and joined SG Wallau-Massenheim, remaining eight seasons with the club. He later also played for MT Melsungen (2005–2007) and HSG Wetzlar (2007–2009).

In March 2012, Đorđić came out of retirement and signed with HSV Hamburg to replace the injured Johannes Bitter until the end of the season.

International career
At international level, Đorđić represented FR Yugoslavia in five major tournaments, winning two bronze medals at the World Championships (1999 and 2001). He also participated in two European Championships (1996 and 1998).

Honours
Partizan
 Handball Championship of FR Yugoslavia: 1992–93
 Handball Cup of FR Yugoslavia: 1992–93
OM Vitrolles
 Championnat de France: 1993–94
 Coupe de France: 1994–95

References

External links
 

1966 births
Living people
Sportspeople from Šabac
Serbian male handball players
Yugoslav male handball players
RK Metaloplastika players
RK Partizan players
MT Melsungen players
HSG Wetzlar players
Handball-Bundesliga players
Expatriate handball players
Serbia and Montenegro expatriate sportspeople in France
Serbia and Montenegro expatriate sportspeople in Germany